Abdusalam Abas Ibrahim, known as Fuad Ibrahim and Ibee Ibrahim (born 15 August 1991), is an Ethiopian former professional footballer who played as a forward.

Early and personal life
Ibrahim was born in Ethiopia and raised in Richfield, Minnesota.

Club career
Ibrahim spent his early career with the IMG Soccer Academy, FC Dallas and Toronto FC. At the time of being drafted in 2007, he was the second-youngest ever player selected in the MLS Superdraft.

Ibrahim graduated from Generation Adidas at the end of the 2010 MLS season. He returned to professional soccer by signing with the Minnesota Stars FC of the North American Soccer League in April 2012.

Ibrahim signed with AC Kajaani of the Finnish 2nd division in April 2013 and scored on his debut.  He joined Oromo United in Minnesota, in 2014, after his time in Finland. In 2016, he joined Dire Dawa City S.C. in Ethiopia.

International career
Ibrahim represented the United States at youth international level, playing for the under-17 and under-20 teams.

He was called up for Ethiopia's squad for the 2013 Africa Cup of Nations, and scored his first international goal in the Antelopes' 2–1 win over Tanzania in the warm-up to the competition.

International goals

Coaching career
After his playing career, he became a youth soccer coach with White Bear Soccer Club in Minnesota.

References

1991 births
Living people
Ethiopian footballers
American expatriate soccer players
American soccer players
Ethiopian emigrants to the United States
Ethiopian expatriate footballers
Expatriate soccer players in Canada
FC Dallas players
Toronto FC players
Minnesota United FC (2010–2016) players
Association football forwards
Sportspeople from Dire Dawa
Soccer players from Minnesota
FC Dallas draft picks
Major League Soccer players
North American Soccer League players
United States men's youth international soccer players
United States men's under-20 international soccer players
Ethiopia international footballers
2013 Africa Cup of Nations players
AC Kajaani players
Dire Dawa City S.C. players